Soundtrack to Our Teenage Zombie Apocalypse is an Australian drama TV series aimed at children and teenagers which premieres on ABC Me on 15 August 2022.

Synopsis
Soundtrack to Our Teenage Zombie Apocalypse follows the story of four music-obsessed teens on a mission to win triple j Unearthed High who find themselves trapped in an abandoned building during a zombie apocalypse. Bandmates Ella and Nick are stuck in a zombie-infested ABC building, surviving on vending machine snacks while they try to finish off the song that will take them to the big leagues. But when Ella's high school nemesis, Veronica and Nick's crippling celebrity crush, Locksley, appear out of thin air, they feel their chances of escaping and - more importantly - of winning Unearthed High start to slip away.

Cast
 Mina-Siale as Ella
 Nick Annas as Nick 
 Ruby Archer as Veronica
 Isaiah Galloway as Locksley

References 

Australian children's television series
Australian Broadcasting Corporation original programming
2020s teen drama television series
2022 Australian television series debuts
Television series about teenagers